Bande à part may refer to:
Bande à part (film), a 1964 film by Jean-Luc Godard
Bande à Part (album), an album by Nouvelle Vague
Bande à part (radio), a French-Canadian music radio station

See also
A Band Apart, Quentin Tarantino's film production company